Parasa similis is a moth of the family Limacodidae first described by Felder in 1874. It is found in Sri Lanka.

References

Moths of Asia
Moths described in 1874
Limacodidae